|}

The Martin Molony Stakes is a Group 3 flat horse race in Ireland open to thoroughbred horses aged four years or older. It is run at Limerick over a distance of 1 mile, 4 furlongs and 110 yards (2,515 metres), and it is scheduled to take place each year in October.

The race was first run in 2003.  The race is named in honour of the locally born jockey Martin Molony who won six consecutive Irish jump racing Champion Jockey titles between 1946 and 1951. Prior to 2017 it was run in late April or early May.

Records

Leading jockey (3 wins):
 Wayne Lordan – Dress Rehearsal (2008), Tannery (2012), Detailed (2017)

Leading trainer (3 wins):
 Aidan O'Brien – Honolulu (2007), Bondi Beach (2016), Sir Erec (2018)

John Oxx – Mkuzi (2004), Behkiyra (2005), Tarana (2014)

Winners

See also
 Horse racing in Ireland
 List of Irish flat horse races

References 
Racing Post: 

Flat races in Ireland
Open middle distance horse races
Limerick Racecourse
2003 establishments in Ireland
Recurring sporting events established in 2003